Mount Veeder AVA is an American Viticultural Area located within Napa Valley AVA among the Mayacamas Mountains. The boundaries of this appellation include  with  planted on thin volcanic soil. Many vineyards are found on the steep mountain face some as steep as 30°. The steepness of the angle gives the vineyards benefits of more direct sunlight and better drainage.

The unique sense of place, or terroir of Mount Veeder AVA produces wines that are typically powerful in structure - depending on how they are made and how the vines are tended. For example, Cabernet Sauvignon grown on the mountain commonly shows "briary" flavors, moderate to bold tannins and herbal, floral aromatics. With the increasing interest in wine in America, wines grown in sub appellation AVA's such as Mount Veeder are gaining recognition for their unique sense of terroir.

Cases produced: approximately 40,000 per vintage, about 1.3% of total Napa Valley production.

Wineries & Growers: There are 35 vintners producing wines from the Mount Veeder AVA. Alpha Omega, Black Stallion, Domaine Chandon, Hess, Mayacamas winery, Rudd and The Vice to name a few.

See also
Domaine Chandon
Mayacamas Vineyards

References

American Viticultural Areas of the San Francisco Bay Area
Mayacamas Mountains
Geography of Napa County, California
American Viticultural Areas
1993 establishments in California